John Salter is an American mixed martial artist.

John Salter may also refer to:

 John MacGregor Salter, known as Jock Salter (1898–1982), Anglo-Scottish footballer who played for Southampton
John W. Salter (1852–1927), American politician
John William Salter (1820–1869), English naturalist and geologist
John Salter, Lord Mayor of London
 John Salter Jr. (1934–2019), Tougaloo College professor and participant in the U.S. Civil Rights Movement, including the sit-in at Woolworth's lunch counter

See also
Jake Clarke-Salter (born 1997), an English footballer
Salter (surname)